'In Plato's Republic, Socrates is highly critical of democracy and proposes an aristocracy ruled by philosopher-kings. Plato's political philosophy has thus often been considered totalitarian by some.

Critique of democracy

In the Republic,'' Plato's Socrates raises a number of objections to democracy. He claims that democracy is a danger due to excessive freedom. He also argues that in a system in which everyone has a right to rule all sorts of selfish people who care nothing for the people but are only motivated by their own personal desires are able to attain power. He concludes that democracy risks bringing dictators, tyrants, and demagogues to power. He also claims that democracies have leaders without proper skills or morals and that it is quite unlikely that the best equipped to rule will come to power.

Ship of State

Plato, through the character of Socrates, gives an analogy related to democracy: he asks us to imagine a ship whose owner surpasses all those on the ship in height and strength, but is slightly deaf; his vision is similarly impaired and his knowledge of navigation is just as bad. He then asks us to imagine the sailors, all of which are arguing about who should have control of the helm while none of them have studied navigation. The sailors don't even know that there is such a thing as the craft of navigation. All the sailors try to convince the owner to give control of the ship over to them, and whoever convinces him becomes the navigator or captain. They manipulate and trick the owner into giving over the helm. The true captain, the one with the knowledge of navigation is seen as a useless stargazer and never becomes the helmsman. The true captain represents a philosopher-king, who knows the forms of justice and goodness.

The ideal form of governance
In the Republic, the character of Socrates outlines an ideal city-state which he calls 'Kallipolis'.

Classes in ideal society
Plato lists three classes in his ideal society.
Producers or Workers: The laborers who make the goods and services in society.
Auxiliaries:  Soldiers.
Guardians/Soldiers: Those who keep order in the society and protect it from invaders.  From them is chosen the Philosopher King/Queen.

Philosopher-kings/Guardians
Plato's ideal rulers are philosopher-kings. Not only are they the most wise, but they are also virtuous and selfless. To combat corruption, Plato's Socrates suggests that the rulers would live simply and communally.

Criticism	
Karl Popper blamed Plato for the rise of totalitarianism in the 20th century, seeing Plato's philosopher kings, with their dreams of  'social engineering' and 'idealism', as leading directly to Adolf Hitler and Joseph Stalin (via Georg Wilhelm Friedrich Hegel and Karl Marx respectively).

References

External links
 Plato: Political philosophy – Internet Encyclopedia of Philosophy
 Philosopher king – Encyclopedia Britannica

Platonism
Political philosophy in ancient Greece